The 1944 Copa del Generalísimo was the 42nd staging of the Copa del Rey, the Spanish football cup competition.

The competition began on 20 February 1944 and concluded on 25 June 1944 with the final, where Atlético de Bilbao won their 15th title.

First round

|}
Tiebreaker

|}

Second round

Third round

Fourth round

|}

Fifth round

|}

Sixth round

|}

Round of 32

|}
Tiebreaker

|}

Round of 16

|}

Quarter-finals

|}

Semi-finals

|}
Tiebreaker

|}

Final

|}

External links
 rsssf.com
 linguasport.com

Copa del Rey seasons
Copa del Rey
Copa